Robert Gabriel Asăvoaei (born 2 October 1998) is a Romanian professional footballer who plays as an attacking midfielder for Dante Botoșani.

Club career

Politehnica Iași
Asăvoaei made his debut at senior level for Politehnica Iași, on 5 June 2017, in a 1–1 draw against Târgu Mureș.

For the second part of the 2017–18 season Politehnica loaned the young Asăvoaei to Liga II club Știința Miroslava, in order for him to get more playing time.

Asăvoaei is known for scoring a scorpion kick in November 2020, while playing for Știința Miroslava.

Honours
SCM Gloria Buzău
Liga III: 2018–19

References

External links
 
 

1998 births
Living people
Sportspeople from Iași
Romanian footballers
Association football midfielders
Liga I players
FC Politehnica Iași (2010) players
Liga II players
Liga III players
CS Știința Miroslava players
FC Gloria Buzău players